Ninəlov (also, Ninalov) is a village and municipality in the Masally Rayon of Azerbaijan.  It has a population of 360.

References 

Populated places in Masally District